Supershitty to the Max! is the debut album by the Swedish rock band The Hellacopters. It was recorded in just 26 hours during February 1996 at Sunlight Studios in Stockholm and released in June that year.

The album was initially released on 500 units of clear vinyl, followed two weeks later by a CD version. A second vinyl release was available in 1997 with 1,500 units in white vinyl, whilst Toys Factory also released the album in Japan with a cover version of the Misfits song "Bullet" as a bonus track.

Track listing 
All tracks written by The Hellacopters.

 On the vinyl version, a bonus track "It's Too Late" as track 6.

Personnel 
The Hellacopters
 Nicke Hellacopter – lead vocals, guitar, maracas
 Ask-Dregen – guitar, backing vocals, tambourine
 Kenny Hellacopter – bass, backing vocals
 Robert Hellacopter – drums, backing vocals, maracas, lead vocals on "How Could I care"

Additional
 Boba Fett – piano
 Hans Östlund – lead guitar on "Ain't No Time"

References

External links 
Official band website

1996 debut albums
The Hellacopters albums
Man's Ruin Records albums